Claude Frassen (1620 – 26 February 1711) was a French Franciscan Scotist theologian and philosopher.

Life
Frassen was born near Péronne, France.  He entered the Franciscan Order at Peronne in his seventeenth year; and after the year of novitiate was sent to Paris, where he completed his studies and remained for thirty years as professor of philosophy and theology. In 1662 he was made doctor of the Sorbonne, and as definitor general, to which office he was elected in 1682, he took part in the general chapters of the order at Toledo and Rome.

Outside of the order his counsel was sought not only by ecclesiastics but likewise by secular dignitaries, Louis XIV of France, in particular, holding him in high esteem. He died in Paris, at the age of 91 years, 74 of which he had spent in religion.

Works

 Scotus Academicus (1901), the best known of the writings of Frassen. This work is rightly considered one of the most important and scholarly presentations of the theology of Duns Scotus. Few, if any, of the numerous interpreters and commentators of Scotus have succeeded so well as Frassen in combining simplicity of style and clearness of method with that subtleness of thought which characterizes Scotistic theology as a whole. The value of the work is enhanced by frequent quotations from the Church Fathers, and by an impartial statement of all controversial questions in scholastic theology. The first volume is prefaced with a chronological list and a brief historical and dogmatical account of the different heresies from the beginnings of Christianity to the fifteenth century. The edition of the Scotus Academicus published by the Friars Minor (Rome, 1900–02, in twelve volumes) was prepared from notes left by the author himself and preserved in the Bibliothèque Nationale of Paris. Earlier editions were those of Paris (1672–77), Rome (1721), Venice (1744).
 Philosophia Academica quam ex selectissimis Illustriorum Philosophorum (1786)
 Cursus Philosophiae, Paris (1688), Venice (1767)
 Disquisitiones Biblicae, volume I, Paris (1682). Chronological indexes: Codices Hebrew, Septante and Samaritan from Adam to Noe First Era (p. 74); Tables Annorum Sabaticorum & Jubilaeorum (p. 273). Note: The year of jubilee or year of redeem that falls right after the period of 7 weeks of years is to be isolated in the calendar, i.e. independent from the previous and following period of 49 years. Frassen has placed it ahead of the 49 years period as part of first year).
 Disquisitiones in Pentateuchum, volume II, Rouen (1705)

References

Schmutz, Jacob, "Frassen, Claude (1620–1711)", in : Dictionary of Seventeenth Century French Philosophers, ed. Luc Foisneau, London - New York : Thoemmes - Continuum, 2008, vol. I, 500–504

External links
Catholic Encyclopedia article
Links to online texts

1620 births
1711 deaths
French Franciscans
17th-century French Catholic theologians
Scotism
French philosophers
French male writers